Meteoritics is the science that deals with meteors, meteorites, and meteoroids. It is closely connected to cosmochemistry, mineralogy and geochemistry. A specialist who studies meteoritics is known as a meteoriticist.

Scientific research in meteoritics includes the collection, identification, and classification of meteorites and the analysis of samples taken from them in a laboratory. Typical analyses include investigation of the minerals that make up the meteorite, their relative locations, orientations, and chemical compositions; analysis of isotope ratios; and radiometric dating. These techniques are used to determine the age, formation process, and subsequent history of the material forming the meteorite. This provides information on the history of the Solar System, how it formed and evolved, and the process of planet formation.

History of investigation
Before the documentation of L'Aigle it was generally believed that meteorites were a type of superstition and those who claimed to see them fall from space were lying.

In 1960 John Reynolds discovered that some meteorites have an excess of 129Xe, a result of the presence of 129I in the solar nebula.

Methods of investigation

Mineralogy
The presence or absence of certain minerals is indicative  of physical and chemical processes. Impacts on the parent body are recorded by impact-breccias and high-pressure mineral phases (e.g. coesite, akimotoite, majorite, ringwoodite, stishovite, wadsleyite).  Water bearing minerals, and samples of liquid water (e.g., Zag, Monahans) are an indicator for hydrothermal activity on the parent body (e.g. clay minerals).

Radiometric dating
Radiometric methods can be used to date different stages of the history of a meteorite. Condensation from the solar nebula is recorded by calcium–aluminium-rich inclusions and chondrules. These can be dated by using radionuclides that were present in the solar nebula (e.g. 26Al/26Mg, 53Mn/53Cr, U/Pb, 129I/129Xe). After the condensed material accretes to planetesimals of sufficient size melting and differentiation take place. These processes can be dated with the U/Pb, 87Rb/87Sr, 
147Sm/143Nd and 176Lu/176Hf methods. Metallic core formation and cooling can be dated by applying the 187Re/187Os method to iron meteorites. Large scale impact events or even the destruction of the parent body can be dated using the 39Ar/40Ar method and the 244Pu fission track method. After breakup of the parent body meteoroids are exposed to cosmic radiation. The length of this exposure can be dated using the 3H/3He method, 22Na/21Ne, 81Kr/83Kr. After impact on earth (or any other planet with sufficient cosmic ray shielding) cosmogenic radionuclides decay and can be used to date the time since the meteorite fell. Methods to date this terrestrial exposure are 36Cl, 14C, 81Kr.

See also 
 Glossary of meteoritics
 Meteor
 Meteoroid
 Meteorite

Notes & references

Notes

References

Further reading

Meteoroids
Meteoritics